Amazon HQ2 is Amazon's corporate headquarters in Crystal City, Arlington, Virginia and is an expansion of the company's headquarters in Seattle, Washington. Phase I, which has capacity for 14,000 employees, is expected to open in June 2023. Construction on Phase II is delayed and there is no timeline for development.

HQ2 was announced in September 2017, when Amazon submitted request for proposals to governments and economic development organizations asking for tax breaks and other incentives to entice the company. Amazon claimed that it intended to spend $5 billion on construction and that HQ2 would house 50,000 workers when completed. More than 200 cities in Canada, Mexico, and the United States eventually offered tax breaks, expedited construction approvals, promises of infrastructure improvements, new crime-reduction programs, and other incentives. On January 18, 2018, a shortlist of 20 finalists was announced, after which the candidate localities continued to detail or expand their incentive packages.

On November 13, 2018, Amazon announced that HQ2 would be split into two locations, with 25,000 workers at each: National Landing in Arlington County, Virginia, and Long Island City in Queens, New York City. Virginia would provide $573 million in tax breaks, $23 million in cash, and other incentives. New York planned to give Amazon tax breaks of at least $1.525 billion, cash grants of $325 million, and other incentives. In February 2019, Amazon cancelled the New York location after strong opposition from local grassroots organizers, residents and politicians. The project had drawn criticism in multiple cities as an example of corporate welfare.

Background

Amazon was founded in 1994 in Bellevue, Washington, and leased space in the SoDo neighborhood of Seattle. As the company grew, it moved offices around Downtown Seattle, until announcing a move to a purpose-built headquarters campus in the South Lake Union neighborhood, then a light industrial enclave undergoing urban renewal. By October 2017, Amazon occupied  of office space in 33 buildings in Seattle, employing 40,000 white collar workers.

Request for proposal
Amazon's request for proposal outlined several core requirements, as well as optional preferences.
 Metropolitan areas with a population of over 1 million
 Within  of a population center
 Within 45 minutes of an international airport
 Proximity to major highways and arterial roads 
 Access to mass transit routes

Optional preferences included airports with direct flights to Seattle, New York City, San Francisco, and Washington, D.C., urban locations, and proximity to major universities.

The deadline for Phase I bids was October 19, 2017. A final site was planned to be selected and announced in November 2018, from a shortlist of 20 cities released in January.

Bids

Submitted
By October 23, 2017, 238 proposals were submitted and received by Amazon, from cities and regions from 54 states, provinces, districts, and territories, including municipalities in all U.S. states except of Arkansas, Hawaii, Iowa, Montana, North Dakota, South Dakota, Vermont, and Wyoming. The Canadian provinces of New Brunswick and Saskatchewan also had no regions submit a bid, along with the Yukon Territory.

In early and mid-October, Little Rock, Arkansas and San Antonio, Texas withdrew their submissions. Little Rock, Arkansas, purchased a full-page ad in The Washington Post "breaking up" with Amazon, where they described their decision to not submit a bid, while also touting the city's positive attributes. A few days after the bid deadline, the campaign flew a banner plane over Seattle with the same message.

Predictions on which cities will win
Moody's Analytics determined that Austin, Texas, ranked highest among Amazon's criteria, followed by Atlanta, Philadelphia, and Rochester, New York. The New York Times found Denver to be the best site based on Amazon's criteria, followed closely by Boston and Washington, D.C. Irish gambling site Paddy Power originally listed Atlanta as the odds on favorite to win HQ2, with 2-to-1 odds, but as of January 2018, listed Atlanta and Austin as sharing 3-to-1 odds of winning Amazon HQ2.

Promotional campaigns
Several cities and groups promoted their HQ2 bids by engaging in promotional campaigns and gimmicks, including offers and gifts to Amazon. Sun Corridor, a Tucson, Arizona economic development firm, sent a 21-foot saguaro cactus to Amazon in an attempt to promote the city's bid. The gift was rejected due to the company's corporate gifts policy, instead donating it to the Arizona-Sonora Desert Museum. The city of Stonecrest, Georgia, a suburb of Atlanta, voted to de-annex  of land for Amazon to establish its own city named Amazon around its headquarters.

Sly James, mayor of Kansas City, Missouri, purchased 1,000 products from Amazon, which he donated to charity. James wrote 5-star reviews for each one of them, in which every review mentioned positive attributes of Kansas City. Primanti Brothers, a chain of sandwich shops based in Pittsburgh, offered free sandwiches to Amazon employees if they chose the city as their second headquarters.

The city of Birmingham, Alabama erected several giant Amazon boxes and dash buttons around public areas. The dash buttons sent out pre-generated tweets to lure Amazon to the city. New York City mayor Bill de Blasio announced that major landmarks in the city would be lit in orange to promote the city's campaign for HQ2.

A group from Calgary sprayed messages onto sidewalks in Seattle's South Lake Union neighborhood urging the company to choose the city. During an Ottawa Senators hockey game, fans were encouraged to "make noise" for the city of Ottawa's Amazon bid.

The neighboring American and Canadian cities of Detroit, Michigan and Windsor, Ontario submitted a bid together and campaigned the two cities to be the home of the new Amazon campus. With the headquarters being divided across the Canada–United States border, the company could take advantage of tax incentives offered by both Ontario and Michigan. Amazon would also be able to capitalize on the less restrictive Canadian immigration laws and the lower currency exchange of the Canadian Dollar.

Criticism and opposition
Steven Strauss, a visiting professor of public policy at Princeton University and an expert on economic development, in an editorial in USA Today suggested that metropolitan areas should be cautious about bidding too generously to win the Amazon bid. He pointed to examples where companies have gone bankrupt or failed to follow up on expansion plans. Strauss also wrote that it was possible that cities could over-pay (the so-called "winner's curse") by providing an overly generous incentive package, which would turn out to be a money-losing proposition for the municipality if all the promised jobs did not materialize.

Conservative and liberal advocacy groups voiced their opposition to various tax breaks promised by cities in hopes of luring Amazon.

In early 2018, New York University Stern School of Business professor Scott Galloway said Amazon was soliciting bids from places that it never intended to move to solely to gain tax breaks. He predicted that HQ2 would be located in either the New York metropolitan area or the Washington metropolitan area; with the decision to create two locations, Galloway ended up predicting both correctly. He repeatedly called the competition a "ruse" and a "con". Galloway said that "the game was over before it started", claiming that the proximity to both Jeff Bezos' home and the United States Capital made the DC area an obvious choice.

Former Seattle Mayor Ed Murray announced that he would begin conversations with Amazon about long-term plans for the city, while the Seattle Metropolitan Chamber of Commerce characterized the announcement as a "wake-up call" to Seattle to improve the city's business climate. Comparisons were made to Boeing's decision to move its corporate headquarters from Seattle to Chicago in 2001, which came as a surprise to Seattle.

Jim Balsillie remarked that he was disappointed in W. Edmund Clark, Kathleen Wynne's czar in charge of the Toronto bid, when in 2017 the latter attempted to sell the buyer on "our competitive advantage... software programmers that cost 34% to 38% less than in the US... that's an edge the government is determined not only to maintain but to sharpen." Balsillie found this strategy to be "misguided... these strategies put our tech workers in a global race to the bottom, competing on cost with the salaries in Poland, Ukraine, and India."

There were concerns that HQ2 would drop a prosperity bomb on the winning communities.

Finalists

On January 18, 2018, Amazon announced its shortlist of 20 finalists for the HQ2 bidding process. The list focuses mainly on the U.S. East Coast and Midwest, with Los Angeles the only selection from the West Coast and Toronto the only one outside of the United States.
 Atlanta, Georgia (including Stonecrest)
 Austin, Texas
 Boston, Massachusetts (Suffolk Downs-East Boston and Somerville)
 Chicago, Illinois (City Center Campus, Downtown Gateway District, River District, Lincoln Yards, The 78, Burnham Lakefront, Fulton Market District, Illinois Medical District, Schaumburg, Oak Brook)
 Columbus, Ohio (Franklinton, Ohio State University, Easton)
 Dallas, Texas
 Denver, Colorado
 Indianapolis, Indiana
 Los Angeles, California
 Miami, Florida
 Montgomery County, Maryland
 Nashville, Tennessee
 Newark, New Jersey
 New York City, New York (West Midtown Manhattan, Financial District, Brooklyn Tech Triangle, Long Island City)
 Northern Virginia (Fairfax and Loudoun counties, including Arlington and Alexandria, in Virginia)
 Philadelphia, Pennsylvania (Schuylkill Yards, uCity Square, Navy Yard)
 Pittsburgh, Pennsylvania
 Raleigh, North Carolina
 Toronto, Ontario (including Mississauga, Brampton, York Region, Durham Region, Halton Region, Waterloo Region, Guelph and Hamilton)
 Washington, D.C. (Anacostia Riverfront, Capitol Hill East, NoMa-Union Station, Shaw-Howard University)

Some of the finalists used their Amazon proposals to attract investments from other multinational corporations.

Amazon representatives began tours of its finalist cities in late February. Bidding cities also signed non-disclosure agreements with Amazon for the duration of the bid process. although the NDA did not prevent disclosure of financial incentives that cities have offered. By May 2018, Amazon representatives had visited the 20 finalist cities. In September 2018, Bezos promised a decision by the end of the year.

On November 4, 2018, The Washington Post and The Wall Street Journal reported that several finalists were in advanced talks with Amazon over the HQ2 decision, including the potential choosing of Crystal City in Northern Virginia. Amazon Director of Economic Development Mike Grella wrote on Twitter that the leaker responsible for informing the newspapers was violating a non-disclosure agreement. Grella also criticized media outlets for speculating on the winning bid for HQ2 based on the travel patterns of Amazon CEO Jeff Bezos, who owns The Washington Post.

Winning bids
The selections of New York City and Northern Virginia for the HQ2 sites were confirmed on November 13, 2018. In Amazon's announcement, a joint press release was presented by the Northern Virginia bidders that Amazon's HQ2 neighborhood location would officially be renamed "National Landing", which encompasses not only Crystal City but also the nearby areas of Pentagon City and Potomac Yard. Amazon also announced that it would employ 5,000 people at a new Operations Center of Excellence in Nashville, Tennessee.

Long Island City

The subsidies offered to Amazon in New York include performance-based direct incentives of $1.525 billion based on whether the company created 25,000 jobs. This included a refundable tax credit through the state's Excelsior Program of up to $1.2 billion, calculated as a percentage of the salaries Amazon expects to pay employees over the following 10 years. Additionally, the Empire State Development Corporation would give Amazon a cash grant of $325 million based on the occupancy rates of HQ2 buildings over in the following 10 years. Under an agreement with New York City's government, half of the property taxes for the city's HQ2 campus would be waived, and the exempt amount would go to the city's PILOT (payment in lieu of taxes) fund to pay for infrastructure improvements in New York City. Both states proposed that Amazon be given access to a helipad, and the New York state government also promised to upgrade infrastructure in conjunction with HQ2's construction there. Officials estimated that Amazon's move would generate $27 billion in taxes over a period of 25 years.

Amazon was said to have chosen New York City as one of the sites for HQ2 because of the city's highly skilled pool of talent; existing tech, finance, and media industries; and strong university system, including Columbia University and Cornell Tech.

Cancellation of New York portion
After the HQ2 campus in New York City was announced, officials representing parts of Queens, such as U.S. Representative-elect Alexandria Ocasio-Cortez, Councilman Jimmy Van Bramer, State Senator Michael Gianaris, and Assemblyman Ron Kim, announced their disapproval. Ocasio-Cortez, Van Bramer, and Gianaris all expressed concern that Amazon would receive tax breaks while critical infrastructure, such as the New York City Subway, was deteriorating, and the New York City public school system and New York City Health Department were underfunded. In a Twitter post, Ocasio-Cortez raised further concerns about the affordability of housing in Queens, since housing prices around the HQ2 campus in Queens began rising in anticipation of the campus's construction. Kim and Fordham University professor Zephyr Teachout wrote an opinion piece in The New York Times in which they stated that the city should "not offer incentives and giveaways to an internet giant known for squashing small businesses."

Politico reported that the Long Island City location would be built on land intended for 6,000 homes, including 1,500 affordable housing units. New York State Senate member Michael Gianaris said, "The more we learn about this deal, the worse it gets." However, polls showed that the majority of New York City residents approved of the deal with Amazon. 

On February 14, 2019, Amazon announced that it would cancel the planned Long Island City location due to opposition. The company also said that it would continue developing the Crystal City and Nashville locations. Bill de Blasio and Cuomo were "blindsided" by Amazon's decision when informed by Amazon VP Jay Carney. New York governor Andrew Cuomo blamed Democrats in the New York State Senate for the cancellation, and New York City mayor de Blasio said that Amazon "threw away that opportunity," by making the announcement. In response, Ocasio-Cortez stated: "If we were willing to give away $3 billion for this deal, we could invest $3 billion in our district ourselves if we want to. We could hire more teachers, we can fix our subways, we can put a lot of people to work for that money if we wanted to." Ocasio-Cortez omitted the fact that the "$3 billion" were merely discounts on taxes of future Amazon activity, not existing cash the city possessed. Mayor de Blasio, among others, criticized her, and those who had made similar remarks, for suggesting the money, mostly in the form of tax credits, was now free to be spent elsewhere. Activist organizations such as Open New York also argued that, in Amazon's absence, the original plans to build 6,000 homes should be re-adopted.

In the weeks following Amazon's decision, Governor Cuomo phoned multiple Amazon executives and even Jeff Bezos, personally asking them to reconsider and guaranteeing them "support." The Partnership for New York City placed an open letter in The New York Times stating that Cuomo "will take personal responsibility for the project's state approval." The letter is signed by Hakeem Jeffries, Carolyn Maloney, Andrew D. Hamilton, David M. Solomon, David N. Dinkins, and Ajay Banga, among others.

According to an interview with CNBC, Amazon's vice president of public policy Brian Huseman denied that politics rather than logistics were a factor in Amazon choosing to cancel its New York location.

The company already had 3,500 tech employees in the New York City area.

In February 2019, Cuomo called the cancellation the "greatest tragedy" he'd seen during his tenure as governor of New York.

Northern Virginia

For the location of HQ2, Amazon selected an area in Northern Virginia encompassing parts of the Crystal City and Pentagon City neighborhoods of Arlington County and the Potomac Yard neighborhood in the city of Alexandria which was branded as "National Landing". While redevelopment efforts in the area had already begun as early as 2014, the cross-jurisdictional neighborhood was branded and announced as "National Landing" in 2018 as a part of local economic development plans to bring Amazon HQ2 to the area. The announcement also included plans to build a graduate school satellite university campus of Virginia Tech in the area. The "National Landing" name derives, in part, from the area's proximity to Ronald Reagan Washington National Airport.

The area includes the Washington Metro station at Crystal City as well as the Potomac Yard station under construction. The Virginia Railway Express (VRE) commuter rail system also has a Crystal City station. The Metroway, a bus rapid transit system, runs through the area, with 15 stations covering the area from Arlington's Pentagon City station to Alexandria's Braddock Road station (south of National Landing), with some of this route located in an exclusive bus lane. A pedestrian bridge to connect National Landing to Washington Reagan National Airport and improvements to the existing Metro rail stations are in process.

Virginia offered performance-based incentives which included a workforce cash grant of $550 million for the first 25,000 jobs Amazon created that paid an average salary of $150,000 by 2030. The state offered an additional $200 million for the next 12,850 qualifying jobs created by 2034. Arlington County offered an additional $23 million in cash grants, to be disbursed over 15 years, contingent on Amazon reaching a certain office size and the gradual increased revenue from a tax collected from the county's hotel rooms. The county also offered an estimated $28 million in infrastructure improvements tied to the property taxes of the Pentagon City and Crystal City area. The state's initial offer was close to $1 billion, according to the Virginia Economic Development Partnership. When Amazon told state officials they would get half of the jobs, the group decided to "essentially cut [the incentives] roughly in half."

Amazon's officials initially said it could occupy up to 8 million square feet of office space in Arlington over the course of 15 years. However, company officials told Arlington in May 2019 that Amazon would not promise anything over 4 million square feet.

Development

Phase 1: Metropolitan Park

Amazon moved its first employees into rented office space in the area in June 2019, and in June 2020, there were roughly 1,000 employees the company counted as HQ2 workers.

In January 2020, the company, via developer JBG Smith, started construction on two 22-story towers at 1450 S. Eads St, proximate to Metropolitan Park. In September 2020, the company began the $14 million renovation of the park. By March 2023, 8,000 workers had been hired to occupy the first phase of HQ2, which has a total capacity of 14,000 workers.

An independent coffee shop and a pet care company signed leases to occupy space in the new development.

The development also includes a public art installation called "Queen City", which was designed by artist Nekisha Durrett. The installation is located in the middle of Metropolitan Park and pays tribute to a former Black community by the same name that was demolished during the construction of The Pentagon.

Phase 2: PenPlace and The Helix
On February 2, 2021, the company announced a proposed design for the second phase of HQ2, PenPlace, to be developed by JBG Smith. The development includes "The Helix", a 354-foot glass nucleic acid double helix art structure with landscaped terrain that would be opened to the public, similar to "Amazon Spheres" at Dopper in Seattle. Founder Jeff Bezos commented that "The natural beauty of a double helix can be seen throughout our world, from the geometry of our own DNA to the elemental form of galaxies, weather patterns, pine cones, and seashells". The Verge described it as resembling a "glass poop emoji covered in trees."

On November 26, 2021, the FAA completed its evaluation of the proposed building and determined that the structure would not be a hazard to air traffic at nearby Ronald Reagan Washington National Airport.

The Arlington County Board approved phase two, including the "Helix" in April 2022.

In March 2023, the company delayed plans to develop the second phase of HQ2.

References

External links
 Amazon website

Amazon (company) facilities
Retail company headquarters in the United States
Companies based in Arlington County, Virginia
Crystal City, Arlington, Virginia